Spring Grove is a historic home located at Oak Corner, Caroline County, Virginia. It was built in 1856, and is an Italian Villa style dwelling built for Daniel Coleman DeJarnette, Sr. (1822–1881) on a plantation that had been owned by the DeJarnette family, French Huguenot immigrants to Virginia, since 1740.  The 26 room, 12,000 square foot mansion is the third house to occupy the site.

It was listed on the National Register of Historic Places in 1976.

References

Houses on the National Register of Historic Places in Virginia
Italianate architecture in Virginia
Houses completed in 1856
Houses in Caroline County, Virginia
National Register of Historic Places in Caroline County, Virginia